James Pull (born 5 October 1999) is a British-Malaysian racing driver currently competing in the 2021 GT World Challenge Europe with W Racing Team.

He made his single seater debut in Formula 4 in the 2015 MSA Formula Championship, driving for JTR and Fortec Motorsport before joining Carlin Motorsport for the 2016 season. In 2017, again with Carlin, he was Vice Champion and Rookie Champion in the 2017 BRDC British Formula 3 Championship. In 2018 he achieved five wins in the Lamborghini Super Trofeo Championship, on his way to Vice-Champion in both Asia and the Middle East championships as well as becoming the first British driver to win a Super Trofeo race in Europe. In 2019, in GT3, James claimed a win in the Silver Cup class on his debut in the Total Spa 24 Hours endurance race of the Blancpain GT Series Endurance Cup. Making his debut in GT World Challenge Europe series in Sep 2020 James won the Silver Cup class at the Nurburgring 6 hour race in his first outing as part of the Aston Martin Racing Driver Academy.

Personal life 
Born in Singapore on 5 October 1999, Pull is of mixed English-Malaysian descent and took up karting at the age of eight, before moving to the United Kingdom at the age of 13 to pursue a full time career in motorsport. Pull resides partly in both Hertfordshire in the United Kingdom and Singapore Outside of Racing, Pull spends his time with his interests in Gaming, Music, and Esports.

Racing career

Karting
Pull began karting in 2008 at the age of eight and competed at a competitive level across Asia (2009-2011) and then in Europe (2011-2014) with Chiesa Corsa and the Tony Kart Racing Team.

Formula 4
Pull graduated to single seaters in 2015, racing with JTR and later Fortec Motorsport for the 2015 MSA Formula Championship. Pull qualified third in his first race at Brands Hatch Indy and his first race weekend saw Pull take two podiums. Pull followed this with a third in qualifying and two further podiums at Donington Park in his second outing. Pull finished in 10th place in his first season in the Championship.

In 2016 Pull joined Carlin Motorsport for the 2016 F4 British Championship. Pull claimed wins at Rockingham and the Brands Hatch GP, resulting in an overall fourth-place finish in the Championship.

Formula 3
In September 2016 Pull made his F3 debut, racing with Carlin Motorsport in the final round of the BRDC British Formula 3 Championship at Donington Park and in October 2016 at the BRDC British F3 Autumn Trophy. In November 2016, Pull was confirmed to be racing with Carlin in the 2017 BRDC British Formula 3 Championship. Pull ended the 2017 BRDC British F3 Championship as both Vice-Champion and Rookie-Champion, one of only two drivers to visit the podium at least once at every round contested.

Toyota Racing Series
In 2018 Pull joined M2 Competition to compete in the Toyota Racing Series in New Zealand. Pull achieved three podiums, finishing in sixth place in the Championship.

Lamborghini Super Trofeo Championship
2018 then saw Pull move into GT's with FFF Racing Team in the Lamborghini Super Trofeo Middle East Championship, claiming a win on his debut race. Pull then followed this with another three wins. Pull finished the championship with four wins out of four races ending the Championship as Lamborghini Super Trofeo Middle East Vice Champion, despite missing the first round. The remainder of 2018 saw Pull compete in the Asian and European Lamborghini Super Trofeo Championships with FFF Racing in Asia and Bonaldi Motorsports in Europe. The season saw Pull ending the Asian series as Lamborghini Super Trofeo Asia Vice Champion and the European Championship in 5th place. Pull became the first British driver to win a Lamborghini Super Trofeo European Race. Pull was also signed up to the Lamborghini Young Driver Program In 2018.

Blancpain GT Series Endurance Cup
In 2019 Pull raced in GT3, with Barwell Motorsport. He competed in the Blancpain GT Series Endurance Cup, racing in the Silver Cup category. 2019 saw Pull win the coveted The Total 24 Hours of Spa.

GT World Challenge Europe
In 2020 Pull is competing with Garage 59, driving an Aston Martin Vantage GT3 as a member of the Aston Martin Racing Driver Academy. On debut with the team, James won his first race, in the Silver Cup category, at the 6 Hour of Nurburgring.

Racing record

Career summary

† As Pull was a guest driver, he was ineligible for points.
* Season still in progress.

Complete Toyota Racing Series results 
(key) (Races in bold indicate pole position) (Races in italics indicate fastest lap)

References

External links
 

Living people
1999 births
British F4 Championship drivers
BRDC British Formula 3 Championship drivers
Carlin racing drivers
Karting World Championship drivers
British racing drivers
Formula Renault 2.0 NEC drivers
Toyota Racing Series drivers
Blancpain Endurance Series drivers
Arden International drivers
M2 Competition drivers
W Racing Team drivers
Fortec Motorsport drivers
Audi Sport drivers